The 1989 election for Mayor of Los Angeles took place on April 11, 1989. Incumbent Tom Bradley was re-elected over ten candidates in the primary election. It would be the last time Bradley ran for mayor, as he chose to retire after his fifth term.

Municipal elections in California, including Mayor of Los Angeles, are officially nonpartisan; candidates' party affiliations do not appear on the ballot.

Election 
Bradley, now in his fourth term, was slowly declining in popularity during his term due to traffic congestion, air pollution, and commercial development threatening residential neighborhoods in the city. He had also run in the 1986 California gubernatorial election, which he lost again to Republican George Deukmejian in a landslide. Despite this, Bradley announced that he would be running for a fifth term. He faced minimal opposition at the start, with councilman Zev Yaroslavsky declining to run because of a private poll that had Bradley in the lead. Bradley was widely expected to easily win re-election. Councilman Nate Holden and former supervisor Baxter Ward filed late into the filing period, giving Bradley two challengers. Holden, who was a newcomer in the City Council, was able to drive up some votes, and in the primary election gained one-third of the vote.

Results

References and footnotes

External links
 Office of the City Clerk, City of Los Angeles

1989
Los Angeles
Los Angeles mayoral election
Mayoral election
Los Angeles mayoral election